Ineia is a village in the Paphos District of Cyprus, located 1 km south of Dhrousha.

Topography 
Inia is located 625 m above sea level. It has 385 residents.

Transportation
Located in the Pafos (Paphos) region, the village of Ineia sits on the mountainous area of Laona and overlooks the Akamas Peninsula. Located 30 km north of Pafos, Ineia can be reached by following either the B7 route and then the E711, or taking the E709 and then the F708.

Naming 

Ineia is believed to derive from the latin "Vinea Engadi" which was a vineyard belonging to the Hospitallers The Knights_Hospitaller who purchased it from the Knights Templar as suggested by Ludolf von Suchem on his tour to the Island in 1350. The vineyards here produced Commandaria. Neighbouring villages Pano and Kato Arodes gets their name from of Rhodes.

Ineia initially takes its name from the word "οίνος" - the word in the ancient Greek language for "wine" - while historical sources refer to it as "Wine" with the spelling of the name of the village gradually changing over time and taking the current form.

Famous People 
 Alkinoos Altıntaş

References

Communities in Paphos District